

There are more than 1,800 properties and districts listed on the National Register of Historic Places in Florida. They are distributed through 66 of the state's 67 counties. Of these, 42 are National Historic Landmarks.

Numbers of listings by county 
The following are approximate tallies of current listings in Florida on the National Register of Historic Places. These counts are based on entries in the National Register Information Database as of April 20, 2018 and new weekly listings posted since then on the National Register of Historic Places website. There are frequent additions to the listings and occasional delistings and the counts here are not official. Also, the counts in this table exclude boundary increase and decrease listings which modify the area covered by an existing property or district and that have a separate National Register reference number.

See also
 Florida Underwater Archaeological Preserve
 List of botanical gardens in Florida
 List of Florida state parks
 List of National Historic Landmarks in Florida
 List of operating lighthouses in Florida
 List of Woman's Clubhouses in Florida on the National Register of Historic Places
 National Register of Historic Places Multiple Property Submissions in Florida
 List of bridges on the National Register of Historic Places in Florida

References

External links

 National Historic Landmarks Program
 Florida's Shipwrecks - 300 Years of Maritime History
 National Register: Aboard the Underground Railroad
 NRHP profiles by county

 
 
Florida